Home is a British-Kosovan drama short film about refugees. The film, which stars Jack O'Connell and Holliday Grainger, was written and directed by Daniel Mulloy. The film, which was made in association with the United Nations, was released in UK cinemas on World Refugee Day 2016. It was Nominated for the European Film Academy Award  and went on to win the BAFTA Award for Best Short Film.

Plot
Thousands of men, women and children struggle to get into Europe as a comfortable English family leave, on what appears to be a holiday.

Cast
 Jack O'Connell as Jack
 Holliday Grainger as Holly
 Tahliya Lowles as Tahliya
 Zaki Ramadani as Zac

Production
Daniel Mulloy, wrote the screenplay after spending time living with refugees who were facing deportation:

<blockquote>"We began chatting and I learned that their clothes had been donated to them by nuns and their son had just been operated on after falling ill sleeping on the floor of a Hungarian jail cell. We were in Kosovo and they were being returned to a nightmare that they had risked their lives to escape. I left them feeling sickened and disturbed. I then returned to the UK, billboards were up on streets that were overtly racist and our politicians were dehumanising those fleeing war zones, referring to them as ‘swarms’ and living in ‘jungles’. The film grew out of the fact that wanted to respond.'''' Daniel Mulloy from Dazed interview by Trey Taylor</blockquote>

ReleaseHome'' premiered at the 2016 South by Southwest. All proceeds from the film’s global screenings went to the United Nations #WithRefugees Coalition.

Awards
 premiered South by Southwest 2016
 Winner 60th British Academy Film Awards Best Short Film 2017
 Winner Special Jury Prize Clermont-Ferrand International Short Film Festival
 Winner Best of Fest Palm Springs International Festival of Short Films
 Winner Port Townsend Film Festival
 Winner Reykjavik International Film Festival
 Winner St. Louis International Film Festival
 Winner Curtas Vila do Conde
 Winner of the GOLDEN LION Cannes Lions International Festival of Creativity
 Winner of the GOLDEN ARROW British Television Advertising Awards

References

External links
 
 

2016 films
2016 short films
BAFTA winners (films)
British drama short films
English-language Kosovan films
Kosovan drama films
2016 drama films
2010s English-language films
2010s British films